Amani may refer to:

Language
Amani, peace in Swahili Language
Amani, (أماني) aspiration in Arabic

Places
Amani, Greece, municipality on the island of Chios
Amani, Iran (disambiguation), places in Iran
Amani Constituency, parliamentary constituency on Zanzibar, Tanzania
Amani High School, Kabul, Afghanistan
Amani Nature Reserve, Tanzania

People
Amani (musician) (born 1980), Kenyan singer
Amani Aguinaldo (born 1995), Filipino footballer
Amani Al-Khatahtbeh (born 1992), American author and tech entrepreneur
Amani Ballour (born 1987), Syrian pediatrician and subject of The Cave
Amani Bledsoe (born 1998), American football player
 Amani Haydar, Australian domestic violence advocate and author, winner of the 2022 Victorian Premier's Prize for Nonfiction 
Amani Hooker (born 1998), American football player
Amani Lewis (born 1994), American artist
Amani Oruwariye (born 1996), American football player
Amani Toomer (born 1974), American football player

Other uses
Abeid Amani Karume International Airport, Zanzibar, Tanzania
Amani sunbird, species of bird
"Amani" character on the animated television series The New Archies
"Amani", 1991 song by Hong Kong rock band Beyond
Amani Afrika (Peace in Africa), tour operator in Kisongo, Tanzania
Amani, equal to 20 afghani

See also
Armani (disambiguation)